Tangerine is a 2015 American comedy-drama film directed by Sean Baker, and written by Baker and Chris Bergoch, starring Kitana Kiki Rodriguez, Mya Taylor, and James Ransone. The story follows a transgender sex worker who discovers her boyfriend and pimp has been cheating on her. The film was shot with three iPhone 5S smartphones.

Tangerine premiered at the 2015 Sundance Film Festival on January 23, 2015. It had a limited release on July 10, 2015, through Magnolia Pictures. It received critical acclaim for its screenplay, direction, performances and portrayal of transgender individuals.

Plot 
Transgender sex worker Sin-Dee Rella, who has just finished a 28-day jail sentence, meets her friend Alexandra, another trans sex worker, at a donut shop in Hollywood on Christmas Eve. Alexandra reveals that Sin-Dee's boyfriend and pimp Chester has been cheating on her with a cisgender woman. Sin-Dee storms out to search the neighborhood for Chester and the woman.

Alexandra hands out flyers for her musical performance that evening, and argues with a client who refuses to pay; their argument is broken up by the police. Razmik, an Armenian cab driver, picks up a prostitute, but ejects her from his cab when he discovers she is not transgender. He meets Alexandra and fellates her in a car wash, then goes home to eat Christmas dinner with his family. Alexandra goes to the bar for her performance, but no customers have arrived.

Sin-Dee finds the woman she is looking for, Dinah, at a brothel in a motel. She hauls her onto a bus to find Chester. Dinah taunts her for believing she is Chester's only girlfriend. Sin-Dee realizes she is late for Alexandra's performance and drags Dinah there instead. She reconciles with Dinah as they smoke crystal meth in the bar bathroom, and Sin-Dee applies Dinah's make-up. Alexandra performs to a mostly empty bar.

Razmik leaves his family to attend Alexandra's performance, saying he has to work, but discovers he is too late and searches for Sin-Dee. Suspicious, his mother-in-law, Ashken, hails another Armenian cab driver, Karo. The driver knows about Razmik's interests, and while initially hesitant, Karo agrees to help her track down Razmik.

Sin-Dee, Alexandra and Dinah go to the donut shop, where Sin-Dee confronts Chester. He insists Dinah means nothing to him and reveals that he and Sin-Dee are engaged. Razmik arrives to solicit Sin-Dee, but he is followed by his mother-in-law. Ashken at first thinks Razmik's secret is that he is smoking marijuana, but Chester accidentally explains that he only has sex with prostitutes. She calls Razmik's wife, who arrives with their infant daughter. An argument between the eight escalates until the shop owner kicks them out. Razmik's wife is upset, but she tells her mother to mind her own business. He and his family go back to their apartment. Dinah walks back to the brothel but is told there is no room for her.

Outside the donut shop, Chester tells Sin-Dee that he also slept with Alexandra. Hurt, Sin-Dee leaves and tries to pick up some clients; they throw urine in her face and drive away shouting transphobic slurs. Alexandra takes Sin-Dee to a laundromat to clean her clothes and wig, and gives her her own wig to wear while they wait.

Cast

Production

Development 
Mark Duplass offered to fund a micro-budget film of Sean Baker's before Baker considered Tangerine. After a two year festival run for his previous film, Starlet, and inspired by the independent films he saw while at the New Zealand Film Festival, Baker called up Duplass to see if the offer still stood, and began work on his next film. The film was executive-produced by the Duplass brothers, and produced by Karrie Cox and Marcus Cox with Through Films, Darren Dean and Shih-Ching Tsou.

Baker and Chris Bergoch collaborated on the screenplay from September through December 2013. Baker and Bergoch met transgender actresses Mya Taylor and Kitana Kiki Rodriguez, who had no major acting experience, at a Los Angeles LGBT Center in 2013.

Filming 
Principal photography took place in Hollywood, California (including West Hollywood clubs and Santa Monica Boulevard), on December 24, 2013 and wrapped on January 18, 2014. After viewing iPhone experiments on Vimeo, Baker and Radium Cheung shot the film using three iPhone 5S smartphones. The money saved on camera equipment was used to pay for shooting locations and to pay extras. They used the FiLMIC Pro app, a video app (to control focus, aperture and color temperature, as well as capture video clips at higher bit-rates) and an anamorphic adapter from Moondog Labs (to capture widescreen), as well as Tiffen's Steadicam Smoothee to capture smooth moving shots.

Baker was able to get some of the kit for free after reaching out to Moondog Labs (whose anamorphic adapters were still in their prototype stage on Kickstarter); they sent him three. He had informed them that he was working with Mark Duplass on the project; "It would let us shoot the way Sergio Leone would shoot westerns."

Post-production 
Baker used Final Cut Pro for a preliminary look of the film and DaVinci Resolve to correct contrast and saturation.

Release 
Tangerine made its world premiere January 23, 2015, at the Sundance Film Festival as part of their NEXT program. Magnolia Pictures bought world rights to the film on January 27, 2015, and confirmed they planned releasing the film later in 2015. The film went on to screen at the San Francisco International Film Festival on May 6, 2015. the Seattle International Film Festival on June 4, 2015, and the Oak Cliff Film Festival on June 11, 2015. The film had its Australian debut at the Sydney Film Festival on June 12, 2015.

The film then played at the Provincetown International Film Festival on June 17, 2015, and the BAMcinemaFest on June 28, 2015. In the Czech Republic, the film premiered at the Karlovy Vary International Film Festival on July 8, 2015. The film was released in a North American limited release on July 10, 2015.  The film was released in the United Kingdom on November 13, 2015, by Metrodome Group.

Critical reception 
The site's critics consensus reads: "Tangerine shatters casting conventions and its filmmaking techniques are up-to-the-minute, but it's an old-fashioned comedy at heart—and a pretty wonderful one at that." On Metacritic, it has a weighted average score of 86 out of 100 based on 35 reviews, indicating "universal acclaim".

The Hollywood Reporter described the film as "a singularly delightful girlfriend movie with an attitude". Varietys Justin Chang wrote that Tangerine is "an exuberantly raw and up-close portrait of one of Los Angeles' more distinctive sex-trade subcultures." A. V. Wires Seth Malvín Romero said, "Tangerine is a stylistic tour-de-force. An original, dazzling, and unforgettable portrayal of betrayal and friendship that easily bests any other film this year." In a positive review, The A.V. Clubs Ignatiy Vishnevetsky wrote that "for all of Tangerine's movement [...] and all of its slapping and arguing, it's the movie's quietest, softest moments that register most strongly." He concludes, "Perhaps these moments feel so graceful because they are oases; they matter because of the harsh, unforgiving terrain that has to be crossed in order to reach them. This terrain is drawn garishly, vividly, and with a sense of fun."

Awards campaign 
The first Academy Awards campaigns for openly transgender actresses supported by a film producer were launched for this film, in 2015, for actresses Kitana Kiki Rodriguez and Mya Taylor, though neither was nominated.

Awards 
 2015 – Directors to Watch (Sean S. Baker), Palm Springs International Film Festival
 2015 – Stanley Kubrick Award, Traverse City Film Festival
 2015 – Prix Nouvelles Vagues au Festival international du film de La Roche-sur-Yon (France)

See also 
 List of lesbian, gay, bisexual or transgender-related films of 2015

References

External links 
 
 
 
 
 
 Official screenplay

2015 films
2015 comedy-drama films
2015 independent films
2015 LGBT-related films
2010s buddy comedy-drama films
2010s Christmas comedy-drama films
2010s English-language films
2010s female buddy films
African-American comedy-drama films
African-American LGBT-related films
American buddy comedy-drama films
American Christmas comedy-drama films
Hood films
American female buddy films
American independent films
American LGBT-related films
Armenian-language films
Duplass Brothers Productions films
Films about prostitution in the United States
Films about trans women
Films directed by Sean Baker
Films set in 2014
Films set in Los Angeles
Films shot in Los Angeles
LGBT-related buddy comedy-drama films
Mobile phone films
2010s American films